Bregana is a settlement (naselje) that is part of the town of Samobor, Zagreb County, Croatia. Together with the nearby settlements of Podvrh and Klokočevec Samoborski, the town's micropolitan area has 3,450 inhabitants.

Together with Macelj and Rupa, Bregana used to be the main Croatian border crossing with Slovenia, before Croatia joined Schengen in 2023. The checkpoint on the Slovenian side of the border was located in a small village called Obrežje. It is the start of the A3 highway which goes to Zagreb and on to Lipovac at the Serbian border in the east. The highway connects to Slovenia's A2 highway, which leads to Ljubljana. There was also a minor border crossing in the town itself, a two-lane road crossing between Bregana and Slovenska Vas. A railway crossing between the two countries used to be located in Harmica near Savski Marof in Brdovec municipality.

References 

Croatia–Slovenia border crossings
Populated places in Zagreb County